Polycnemum arvense is a species of flowering plant belonging to the family Amaranthaceae.

It is native to Europe to China.

References

Amaranthaceae